Dennis Vernon Dold Lacey (1919-1942) was a South African flying ace of World War II, credited with 5 'kills' and 2 probables.

Lacey was born in Rhodesia but grew up in Cape Town. He joined the Permanent Force in July 1940 in the South African Air Force. He joined 2 Squadron SAAF in 1941 and was awarded a DFC.
He was posted to 6 Squadron SAAF in South Africa till June 1942 before being posted to 5 Squadron SAAF in the Western Desert. He was promoted to Officer Commanding in July 1942.

He was killed on 7 August 1942 when we was shot down after being hit by flak.

References

South African World War II flying aces
1919 births
1942 deaths
South African military personnel of World War II
Recipients of the Distinguished Flying Cross (United Kingdom)
South African military personnel killed in World War II
Aviators killed by being shot down
Rhodesian emigrants to South Africa